Peter Grinspoon (born 1966), an American born physician, is an internist and medical cannabis specialist at Massachusetts General Hospital and an instructor at Harvard Medical School. He is an expert on the topic of medical and recreational cannabis, and also has a strong interest in the areas of physician health, addiction and recovery, and in psychedelic treatments. He is a certified physician coach for the MGH Center for Physician Well Being as well as a Health and Wellness Coach. His 2016 book Free Refills: A Doctor Confronts His Addiction, published by Hachette Books Group was the first memoir by a physician to confess to and describe recovery from an opiate addiction. This book was optioned by MarVista Entertainment though the option has reverted back to Grinspoon. His next book will come out on 4/20/23 and is named, "''''Seeing Through the Smoke: A Cannabis Expert Untangles the Truth About Marijuana''''' (Prometheus), and features a foreward written by Dr. Andrew Weil (link). He has appeared on national television programs including 'The Daily Show', 'Good Morning America', CBS Mornings', Fox and Friends, Fox Nation, NBC Nightly News, 'MSNBC' and C-SPAN2 to discuss drug policy, cannabis legalization as well as his addiction and recovery. He served as an Associate Director for Massachusetts Physician Health Service, part of the Massachusetts Medical Society from 2013 to 2015, helping and advocating for other physicians who struggle with addiction.

Grinspoon is also a contributing editor to Harvard Health Publications  where his blogs, Medical Marijuana and CBD- What We Know and What We Don't, as well as dozens of others, have accumulated millions of page views, with his blog on CBD alone having more than 5 million page views. He is an authority on virtually all aspects of cannabis, including recreational and medical usages, as well as political issues and social history.
He is a board member of the advocacy group Doctors For Cannabis Regulation and speaks internationally on various cannabis-related issues. He is frequently cited in the popular press, and has been noted in USA Today, The Washington Post, The New York Times, The Wall Street Journal, People Magazine, NY Magazine, The Daily Beast, and The Boston Globe. He has also been cited in magazines and websites as diverse as the following:
Chicago Tribune, WSJ, Politico, Cooking Light, Forbes, Filter, El País, el Planeto, The Guardian, Martha Stewart, Florida Sun Sentinel, Leafly, AARP, Christianity Today, St. Louis Post-Dispatch, Missourian, Detroit Free Press (USA Today Network), MD Magazine, Tonic (Vice), MedPage Today, Reason, Texas Tribune, Medium, City Watch, Illinois Public Media, National Pain Report, Greenville News, AlterNet, The Narrative Inquiry on Bioethics, Discover Magazine and The Chronicle of Higher Education. Dr. Grinspoon famously defeated Alex Berenson (link) at a debate on cannabis and mental health at Yale Law School in 2019 (citation: https://lfpress.com/cannabis-health/alex-berenson-gets-smoked-by-dr-peter-grinspoon-in-debate-on-cannabis-and-mental-health/wcm/c84b922e-5ad1-4925-bd82-7c099493b5e0/)

He has appeared on numerous podcasts and radio programs. He was featured on NPR's All Things Considered in a piece about the harmfulness of withholding medication assisted treatment for opioid use disorders from physicians.. Other radio shows include 'Only Human with New York public radio and several of the National Public Radio (NPR) shows in Boston including Prescription For Redemption and Commonhealth Blog, as well as Blunt Talk IHeart Radio. He was named in 2021 as one of the top 100 People in Cannabis and Psychedelics by The Bluntness. (citation: https://www.thebluntness.com/posts/bluntness-100-healthcare-and-science) He was featured in Men's Health Magazine in 2021 as being a hero in recovery. (Citation: https://www.menshealth.com/health/a36291985/peter-grinspoon-addiction-recovery-opioids/) He published a major piece in Psychiatric Times in 2022 on physicians and addiction. (Citation: https://www.psychiatrictimes.com/view/understanding-and-addressing-physician-substance-use-and-misuse)

Early life and career
Grinspoon is the son of famous cannabis activist Lester Grinspoon and the brother of respected planetary scientist and popular writer David Grinspoon. He is the nephew of billionaire philanthropist Harold Grinspoon He grew up in Wellesley, Massachusetts, with a twin brother Joshua, his older brother David, and another older brother Danny, who died at the age of 16 from leukemia. Danny's struggle with leukemia has been documented in the popular press as medical cannabis was vitally helpful to him and Danny's parents were forced to procure cannabis illegally for him during Nixon's War on Cannabis. .

Grinspoon graduated from Swarthmore College with Honors in Philosophy and then went to work for Greenpeace for five years before enrolling in medical school. At Greenpeace, he wrote an influential piece in The Nation titled, "Atom and Eve: A Love Story" based on leaked documents from the nuclear industry. He also was instrumental in one of Greenpeace's most high-profile protests, the successful stoppage of a Trident 2 nuclear missile test.

In 1993, Grinspoon entered Boston University School of Medicine, graduating with Honors. From 1997 to 2000 He trained at Harvard's Brigham and Women's Hospital, in the Primary Care Medical Residency, giving his senior presentation on medical cannabis.

Additional activities
Grinspoon was a consultant to the 2018 production of Jagged Little Pill'' at the American Repertory Theater. He was a contributor to Harvard's online course OpioidX: The Opioid Crisis in America. He was one of the featured members of the Boston Resilient Exhibit, which honored Boston-area leaders in the fight against addiction. He served as an expert witness at the lawsuit successfully challenging the ban against vaping cannabis in Massachusetts in 2019.

References

1966 births
Living people
American physicians
Boston University School of Medicine alumni
Physicians of Massachusetts General Hospital
Swarthmore College alumni